Frederick Bagemihl (June 25, 1920 – April 12, 2002)  was a mathematician at University of Wisconsin–Milwaukee. He was a visiting scholar at the Institute for Advanced Study from 1953 to 1955.

Bibliography
 Meromorphic functions with a single principal cluster set, Suomalainen tiedeakatemia, Helsinki, 1974, 
 Sequential and continuous limits of meromorphic functions, Suomalainen Tiedeakatemia, Helsinki, 1960, OCLC 247617805

References

External links

1920 births
2002 deaths
Institute for Advanced Study visiting scholars
University of Wisconsin–Milwaukee faculty
20th-century American mathematicians